Strode's Mill, also known as Etter's Mill, is a historic grist mill located in East Bradford Township, Chester County, Pennsylvania. It was built in 1721, and is a 3 1/2-story, banked fieldstone structure.  It measures approximately 30 feet by 58 feet.  The building houses a private residence.

It was added to the National Register of Historic Places in 1971.  It is located in the Strode's Mill Historic District.

References

External links
 Strode's Grist Mill, Lenape & Birmingham Roads (East Bradford Township), Sconnelltown, Chester County, PA: 2 photos, 5 data pages, and 1 photo caption page at Historic American Buildings Survey

Grinding mills on the National Register of Historic Places in Pennsylvania
Industrial buildings completed in 1721
Grinding mills in Chester County, Pennsylvania
Historic district contributing properties in Pennsylvania
National Register of Historic Places in Chester County, Pennsylvania
1721 establishments in Pennsylvania